"Endscape" is the 7th single by the Japanese band Uverworld. It was released on May 30, 2007 in two different formats, CD only and CD+DVD. The song endscape was featured as the first opening song to the anime series Toward the Terra.

Track listing

 "Endscape"
 "Unknown Orchestra"
 "Monochrome: Kizuke Nakatta Devotion (モノクローム～気付けなかったDevotion～)"

Charts

Oricon sales chart (Japan)

Further reading

External links
 

2007 singles
Uverworld songs
2007 songs
Gr8! Records singles